DEV Arahura was a roll-on/roll-off train ferry that operated on the Interislander service between Wellington and Picton in New Zealand from 1983 until 2015.

History

She was designed to operate at a faster service speed than the previous ferries on the route, while reducing waves that would affect nearby beaches. This reduced the crossing time by 20 minutes. It entered service on 21 December 1983.

This was the second inter-island ferry to bear the name Arahura (a Māori word meaning "Pathway to Dawn"). The earlier vessel was a twin-screw steamship built in Scotland for the Union Steamship Company in 1905. That ship served until the early 1950s and was sunk by the Royal New Zealand Air Force as target practice.

In 1986, Arahura helped rescue passengers from the sinking Russian cruise liner , providing lifeboats and extra assistance.

On 11 April 1989, Arahura rolled to 40 degrees during a routine sailing from Picton to Wellington because of stormy conditions in Cook Strait.

In 2008, Arahura underwent a $NZ9 million refit to better accommodate larger trucks and campervans. This included reducing some of the upper decks and installing a new cinema and cafeteria.

In 2014, she made her 50,000th Cook Strait crossing.

In December 2014, KiwiRail announced that Arahura would be retired in 2015 after 32 years in service. Kaiarahi was chartered to replace her on the route. Arahura'''s last scheduled passenger voyages were on 29 July 2015, operating the 14:45 sailing to Picton and the 18:45 sailing to Wellington. The last freight journey took place over the following night. She had completed more than 52,000 crossings and 13 million km with four million passengers carried.

On 3 October 2015, renamed Ahura and with her Interislander livery painted out, she departed Wellington, bound for the Alang scrapyard in India, being beached there on 3 November.Ferries in the News Ships Monthly January 2016 page 11 Scrapping was completed in late January 2016.

LiveryArahura changed liveries three times in her lifetime. Originally, she had a green hull and buff, red, and black on the funnel (a modified 1970s NZR logo).

In 1989, the inter-island service was re-branded as a "ferry cruise", and the livery of all the ferries was replaced with a white hull with blue and green stripes. The funnels now carried a stylized Pelorus Jack, a dolphin famous for assisting vessels navigating across the Cook Strait.

The liveries were changed again in 2004. Pelorus Jack was relocated to the hull and the funnels were now blue with a fern replacing Pelorus Jack.

PropulsionArahura'' was a diesel-electric vessel. She had a fuel capacity of 450,000 litres and was built with the capability to provide power ashore for civil defence or similar emergencies providing 14 MW power - enough to light all the houses in Wellington.

Deck layout

Rail and road vehicles were loaded and unloaded through the stern of the ship via a double linkspan. Passengers without vehicles boarded through a walkway on the starboard side.

 Decks 1 and 2 were below the waterline and contained the ship's engines, control room and other machinery.
 Deck 3 was the rail deck, which could also hold motor vehicles.
 Deck 5 was the dedicated vehicle deck.
 Deck 7 contained passenger accommodation, including a play area, video arcade, food court, a cinema, and a store.
 Deck 8 contained the passenger observation decks and the Queen Charlotte Cafe and Bar.
 Deck 9 housed the bridge and officers' quarters. She carried approximately 70 crew, half of whom lived on board on a 7 days on, 7 days off roster cycle.

References

External links

 Arahura at the Interislander
 DEV Arahura at the New Zealand Maritime Index

Cook Strait ferries
1983 ships
Ships built in Aalborg